Yvonne Darlene Jones (August 7, 1953 – February 23, 2016) was the American commissioner of the Lone Star Football League and Champions Indoor Football. In 2009, she was a member of the executive committee for the Indoor Football League. In 2005, Jones bought the San Angelo Stampede Express. In 2010, she was named IFL Executive of the Year.

Personal
Darlene has one daughter who helped run the San Angelo Stampede Express and two grandchildren.

Death
On February 23, 2016, Jones died following a brief period with cancer, at the age of 62.

References

Additional sources
 

1953 births
2016 deaths
American football executives
Deaths from cancer in Texas